The 1996 International League season took place from April to September 1996.

The Columbus Clippers defeated the Rochester Red Wings to win the league championship.

Attendance
Charlotte Knights - 326,761
Columbus Clippers - 532,468
Norfolk Tides - 510,130
Ottawa Lynx - 347,050
Pawtucket Red Sox - 468,930
Richmond Braves - 500,035
Rochester Red Wings - 391,819
Scranton/Wilkes-Barre Red Barons - 458,033
Syracuse Chiefs - 300,410
Toledo Mud Hens - 316,126

Standings

Stats

Batting leaders

Pitching leaders

Regular season

Playoffs

Division Series
The Rochester Red Wings won the East Division Finals over the Pawtucket Red Sox, 3 games to 1.

The Columbus Clippers won the West Division Finals over the Norfolk Tides, 3 games to none.

Championship series
The Columbus Clippers won the Governors' Cup Finals over the Rochester Red Wings, 3 games to none.

References

External links
International League official website 

 
International League seasons